Swartz may refer to:

Places
Swartz, Louisiana
Swartz Creek (disambiguation)
Swartz Bay, British Columbia on the north end of the Saanich Peninsula on Vancouver Island
Swartz Bay Ferry Terminal
Swartz Nunataks, in Antarctica

People
Swartz (surname)

See also
Schwartz (disambiguation)
Schwarz (disambiguation)